The 1976 Paris–Roubaix was the 74th edition of the Paris–Roubaix, a classic one-day cycle race in France. The single day event was held on 11 April and stretched  from Chantilly to the finish at Roubaix Velodrome. The winner was Marc Demeyer from Belgium.

Results

See also
 A Sunday in Hell, a 1976 Danish documentary film about the race

References

Further reading
 

Paris–Roubaix
Paris-Roubaix
Paris-Roubaix
Paris-Roubaix
Paris-Roubaix